Saint-Ouen is a commune in the Loir-et-Cher department in central France.

Geography
Saint-Ouen is situated on the left bank of the Loir. The town of Saint-Ouen is bisected by the RN10, a highway that runs between Paris and Bordeaux.

Population

See also
Communes of the Loir-et-Cher department

References

Communes of Loir-et-Cher